Patricia Glass (born 14 February 1957) is a Labour Party former politician who was the Member of Parliament for North West Durham from 2010 to 2017. She was appointed Shadow Education Secretary on 27 June 2016 by Jeremy Corbyn, but resigned two days later after announcing that she would be standing down at the next United Kingdom general election.

Early life and career
She was born in Esh Winning, County Durham. Before becoming an MP, Glass worked in various positions with local education authorities, and became a Government Education Adviser specialising in Special Needs Education, and Assistant Director of Education in Sunderland and Greenwich.

Glass was elected as a councillor on Lanchester Parish Council in 2007. Subsequently she was selected as the Labour Party parliamentary candidate for North West Durham, with Hilary Armstrong due to retire at the 2010 general election.

Political career
Glass was elected to the House of Commons at the 2010 general election as the Member of Parliament (MP) for North West Durham. Her particular interest is education, and has sat on the Education Select Committee

In 2014, Glass accused rival politicians in Parliament of "orchestrated barracking" of women with regional accents, saying "I get the impression they think women who are northerners should not be there."

In September 2015, Glass was appointed as Shadow Education Minister with responsibility for childcare by the newly elected Labour Party leader, Jeremy Corbyn. On 5 January 2016, she was named the Shadow Europe Minister after Corbyn had conducted the first reshuffle of his Shadow Cabinet.

Glass took a prominent role in Labour's campaign to remain in the EU in the June 2016 referendum campaign. On 19 May 2016, she apologised after calling a member of the public in Sawley, Derbyshire, "a horrible racist", which was caught at the end of a radio interview recording and reported by the media. She also added "I'm never coming back to wherever this is".

At a Labour rally, she suggested voters try to persuade their mothers and grandmothers to vote to stay in, but joked they didn't bother with their grandfathers because "the problem is older white men". She reported having received death threats during the referendum campaign, and on the advice of the police, she did not attend the referendum count.

On 27 June 2016, Glass was appointed Shadow Education Secretary following the resignation of Lucy Powell and several other Cabinet ministers in protest at Corbyn's leadership during the EU referendum. The next day, Glass announced that she would not stand at the next general election. The day after that, she resigned as Shadow Education Secretary, saying that the "situation is untenable", and making the statement:

Glass stood down at the 2017 snap general election, citing the "bruising referendum" as a major cause.

Personal life 
Glass lives with her husband Bob in Lanchester, County Durham. Bob Glass served on Durham County Council from 2013 to 2017 as the Councillor for Delves Lane ward. Her brother Martin Gannon is a Councillor on Gateshead Council and is currently leader of the Council.

References

External links
 North West Durham Constituency Labour Party

|-

|-

1957 births
21st-century British women politicians
Female members of the Parliament of the United Kingdom for English constituencies
Labour Party (UK) MPs for English constituencies
Living people
People from Esh Winning
UK MPs 2010–2015
UK MPs 2015–2017
21st-century English women
21st-century English people